My Little Old Boy (a.k.a. Mom's Diary: My Ugly Duckling) is a South Korean television entertainment program, distributed and syndicated by SBS every Sunday at 21:05 (KST), starting from August 26, 2016.

Overview 
This reality program focuses on the mothers of South Korean celebrities. Unlike the generic reality program which focuses solely on the celebrity, My Little Old Boy features commentary from the celebrities' mothers as they watch the footage of their sons and or daughters' daily activities.

Changes in running time

Hosts

Main
 Shin Dong-yup
 Seo Jang-hoon

Casts

Current regular casts
 Lee Sang-min
 Kim Jong Kook
 Kim Hee-chul (Super Junior)
 Tak Jae-hoon
 Kim Jun-Ho
 Im Won Hee
 Oh Min-suk
 Heo Kyung-hwan

List of episodes

List of guests

Ratings 
  numbers are the highest ratings,  number represents the lowest ratings.
 Ratings listed are the highest ratings for each episodes.

2016

2017

2018

2019

2020

2021

2022

Awards and nominations

Notes

References

External links 
  

Seoul Broadcasting System original programming
2016 South Korean television series debuts
Korean-language television shows
South Korean variety television shows